In Film/On Video is a collection of video and film of Washington D.C. rock band The Make-Up released in 2006 by Dischord Records.  Included on the DVD:

Blue is Beautiful
33 minute film by James Schneider, shot in 16 mm film, with optional audio commentary by Make-Up front man Ian Svenonius.
Music videos: "Save Yourself," "White Belts," "Call Me Mommy," and "Little Black Book"
Previously unreleased video version of "Save Yourself" and three instrumental demos.  The footage consists primarily of 16 mm outtakes from Blue is Beautiful and other footage taken of the group by other filmmakers.
Live performances
43 minutes of live footage from the Wilson Center in Washington, D.C. and The Troubadour in West Hollywood, California.
Spex feature
7 minute "intercept" from German TV, featuring an introduction by the band and a montage of live performances.

The Blue is Beautiful one sheet:

External links 
In Film/On Video at Dischord Records site
In Film/On Video at Southern Records site

The Make-Up video albums
Punk films
2000s English-language films